Istanbul, as the capital of the Ottoman Empire since 1453 and the largest city in the Middle East, contains a great number of mosques. In 2007, there were 2,944 active mosques in Istanbul.

Byzantine buildings

These Byzantine structures were converted to mosques by the Ottomans.
Arap Mosque
Atik Mustafa Pasha Mosque
Bodrum Mosque
Eski Imaret Mosque
Fenari Isa Mosque
Hirami Ahmet Pasha Mosque
Gül Mosque
Hagia Sophia Mosque
 Chora Church now Kariye Mosque.  
Kalenderhane Mosque
Kasim Aga Mosque
Kefeli Mosque
Koca Mustafa Pasha Mosque
Little Hagia Sophia
Pammakaristos Church
Sancaktar Hayrettin Mosque
Vefa Kilise Mosque
Zeyrek Mosque

Ottoman mosques

Eyüp Sultan Mosque, 1458
Mahmut Pasha Mosque, Eminönü, 1463
Fatih Mosque, 1470
Murat Pasha Mosque, Aksaray, 1471
Rum Mehmed Pasha Mosque, 1471
Firuz Ağa Mosque, 1491
Bayezid II Mosque, 1506
Yavuz Selim Mosque, 1527/28
Piri Mehmed Pasha Mosque, 1530–31
Haseki Sultan Mosque, 1539
Defterdar Mosque, 1542
Mihrimah Sultan Mosque (Üsküdar), 1548
Şehzade Mosque, 1548
Burmalı Mescit Mosque (Burmalı Mescit Camii), 1550
Hadim Ibrahim Pasha Mosque, 1551
Sinan Pasha Mosque (Istanbul), 1555
Süleymaniye Mosque, 1558
İskender Pasha Mosque, Kanlıca, 1560
Rüstem Pasha Mosque, 1563
Mihrimah Mosque, 1565
Kara Ahmet Pasha Mosque, c 1572
Sokollu Mehmet Pasha Mosque, 1572
Zal Mahmud Pasha Mosque, 1577
Kılıç Ali Pasha Complex, 1580
Şemsi Pasha Mosque, 1581
Atik Valide Mosque, 1583
Molla Çelebi Mosque, 1584
Mesih Mehmed Paşa Mosque, 1585
Kırmızı Minare Mosque, probably 1591
Sultan Ahmed Mosque (Blue Mosque), 1616
New Mosque (Istanbul), 1665
Yeni Valide Mosque, 1710
Nuruosmaniye Mosque, 1755
Zeynep Sultan Mosque, 1769
Emirgan Mosque, 1781
Laleli Mosque, 1783
Teşvikiye Mosque, 1794
Muhammad Maarifi Mosque, 1818
Nusretiye Mosque, 1826
Küçük Mecidiye Mosque, 1843
Dolmabahçe Mosque, 1855
Ortaköy Mosque, 1856
Altunizade Mosque, 1865
Pertevniyal Valide Sultan Mosque, 1872
Yıldız Hamidiye Mosque, 1886
Bebek Mosque, 1913

Handan Agha Mosque, 15th century
İskender Pasha Mosque, Fatih, 15th or 16th centuries

Post-Ottoman mosques
Şişli Mosque, 1949
Şakirin Mosque, 2009
Sancaklar Mosque, 2012
Mimar Sinan Mosque, 2012
Çamlıca Mosque, 2019
Taksim Mosque, 2021

See also 
 List of mosques in Turkey
 İslam in Turkey

References

 
Istanbul
Mosques in Istanbul